Pandulf III may refer to:

 Pandulf III of Capua (died 1014)
 Pandulf III of Salerno (died 1052)
 Pandulf III of Benevento (died 1060)